KV Adler Rauxel, is an amateur Korfball club from Castrop-Rauxel, Germany. The club is historically one of two clubs dominating German Korfball together with KC Grün-Weiß.

Squad (Current)

Head coach    
   Fernow, Patrick

Honours
 German Champion (24 times): 1975, 1976, 1977, 1978, 1981, 1982, 1983, 1984, 1985, 1986, 1987, 1988, 1989, 1990, 1991, 1999, 2002, 2003, 2005, 2007, 2008, 2009, 2010, 2011, 2016; 2020;
 DTB Cup Winners (5 times): 2006, 2007, 2009, 2010, 2011, 2014, 2018
 IKF Korfball Shield (1 time): 2018

External links
Adler Rauxel
German Korfball

Korfball teams
Korfball in Germany